Stainton is a civil parish in the South Lakeland District of Cumbria, England. It contains eleven listed buildings that are recorded in the National Heritage List for England.  All the listed buildings are designated at Grade II, the lowest of the three grades, which is applied to "buildings of national importance and special interest".  The parish contains the village of Stainton, and is otherwise rural.  The Lancaster Canal passes through the parish and a number of structures associated with it are listed.  The other listed buildings include a farmhouse, a packhorse bridge, a church, a boundary stone, a boundary post, and a milestone.


Buildings

References

Citations

Sources

Lists of listed buildings in Cumbria